José Pardo may refer to:

José Pardo y Barreda (1864–1947), Peruvian politician, twice president of Peru
José Antonio Pardo (born 1988), Spanish footballer
José González Pardo (born 1939), Chilean footballer and manager
Sport José Pardo, a Peruvian football club in Tumán, Lambayeque

See also
Joseph Pardo (disambiguation)